Lyudmila Nikolayevna Porubayko (born 24 April 1950) is a Soviet swimmer. She competed at the 1972 Summer Olympics in the 100 m and 200 m breaststroke and finished seventh in the latter event. Between 1969 and 1973 she won two national titles, and in 2011, she won a bronze medal in the 200 m breaststroke at the European masters championships.

She graduated from the Kuban State Medical University in 1974, where she defended her PhD in 1985, and since 1991 is chairing the sports department.

References

1950 births
Living people
Russian female swimmers
Female breaststroke swimmers
Swimmers at the 1972 Summer Olympics
Olympic swimmers of the Soviet Union
Universiade medalists in swimming
Soviet female swimmers
Sportspeople from Krasnodar
Universiade silver medalists for the Soviet Union
Medalists at the 1973 Summer Universiade